Matchbox is a 2017 Indian Malayalam-language romantic comedy film written by Nikhil Anand and Kenny Peruzzi and directed by Sivaram Mony. Starring Roshan Mathew, Vishak Nair, and Drishya Raghunath. The film was produced by Revathy Kalamandhir. It is the debut film of Sivaram Mony. The film was released on 15 September 2017.

Plot
Ambu, a carefree college student falls in love with Nidhi, a girl he sees at a bus stop. He finds out that her father is a friend of his own father and tries to convey his feelings to her. However, by the time he could profess his feelings, things go awry.

Cast
 Roshan Mathew as Ernesto Narendran aka Ambu
 Vishak Nair as Ashok Raj aka Pandi
 Drishya Raghunath as Nidhi
 Joe John Chacko
 Mathew Joy Mathew
 Rony David as Vijay Babu
 Mruthul T. Viswanath
 Shammi Thilakan as Sakhavu Narendran
 Ashokan as Vinod, Nidhi's father
 Sharath as Fidel Narendran aka Appu
 Sai Krishna as Kishore
 Sudeep
 Karthika Kannan as Nidhi's mother
 Srinidhi Ganguly
 Valsala Menon
 Fahim Safar
 Jayadeep. V. Nair as Raju
 Sivaram Mony as Sathyan

Production

According to director Sivaram Mony, Matchbox is a coming-of-age story containing love, friendship and fun. It was shot in Kozhikode. "Matchbox, as the name suggests, is about how a few people fit perfectly in a box, or a society. Though there are four main characters in the movie, Matchbox is mainly about Ambu," says Sivaram. The film is about four friends and the strong bond they share. "While we paid tribute to the city through the movie, Kozhikode and its unique slang helped us a lot in establishing the depth of friendship the characters share," says Sivaram. Matchbox was produced under the banner of Revathy Kalamandir.

Music

References

External links
 

2010s Malayalam-language films
Indian romantic comedy films
Films scored by Bijibal
Films shot in Kozhikode
2017 romantic comedy films